The 2021 Copa Constitució was the 29th edition of the Andorran national football knockout tournament. The opening round of this edition of the cup was played on 17 February 2021.

Inter Club d'Escaldes were the defending champions after winning the final over FC Santa Coloma by a score of 2–0.

Schedule

First round
Eight clubs competed in the first round. The matches were played on played on 17 and 18 February 2021.

|}

Quarter–finals
Eight clubs competed in the quarter–finals: the four winners from the first round and four clubs receiving a bye.

 (1)
(1)
(1)
(1)
|}

Semi–finals
The four quarter–final winners competed in the semi–finals.

(1)
(1)
|}

Final
The final was played between the winners of the semi-finals on 30 May 2021.

See also
2020–21 Primera Divisió
2020–21 Segona Divisió

References

External links
UEFA

Andorra
Cup
2021